Dasycrotapha is a genus of bird in the family Zosteropidae.

It contains the following species:
 Flame-templed babbler (Dasycrotapha speciosa)
 Mindanao pygmy babbler (Dasycrotapha plateni)
 Visayan pygmy babbler (Dasycrotapha pygmaea)

References
Moyle, R. G., C. E. Filardi, C. E. Smith, and J. Diamond. 2009. Explosive Pleistocene diversification and hemispheric expansion of a "great speciator." Proceedings of the National Academy of Sciences of the United States of America 106: 1863–1868.

 
Bird genera
Zosteropidae

Taxonomy articles created by Polbot